Gear Blues is an album by the band Thee Michelle Gun Elephant, released in 1998. It was released in the United States in 2000.

Critical reception
NME wrote: "Armed with an arsenal of hooks, chiselled cheekbones and oodles of self belief, Thee Machine Gun Elephant are credible heirs to the garageland throne, and, if that wasn’t enough, a paragon of internationalism." LA Weekly thought that "vocalist Yusuke Chiba is a hoarsely authoritative presence, and bassist Koji Ueno and drummer Kazuyuki Kuhara have eliminated the Who-derived busyness of their early approach in favor of seamless, no-nonsense propulsion." Rolling Stone concluded that "the attention to visceral detail is what distinguishes Gear Blues from mere Nuggets and Brit-punk slavishness."

AllMusic wrote that "the album ends with a bittersweet, melancholy, space punk groove on 'Danny Go'."

Track listing 
 "West Cabaret Drive" – 5:26
 "Smokin' Billy" – 3:26
 "Satanic Boom Boom Head" – 2:50
 "Dog Way" – 3:15
 "Free Devil Jam" – 2:42
 "Killer Beach" – 5:10
 "Brian Down" – 4:45
 "Hotel Bronco" – 1:43
 "Give The Gallon" – 5:15
 "G.W.D." – 3:52
 "Ash" – 3:34
 "Soul Wrap" – 4:14
 "Boiled Oil" – 4:10
 "Danny Go" – 4:54
 "Jenny" - 3:22

European Release

The European release does not contain 'Jenny' but has an extra bonus disk with 'Get Up Lucy' and 'Cisco'

References

Thee Michelle Gun Elephant albums
1998 albums